Douglas Duane Somerson (September 22, 1951 – May 16, 2017) was an American professional wrestler known by his ring name "Pretty Boy" Doug Somers. He worked in the American Wrestling Association (AWA) in the mid-1980s as part of a tag team with "Playboy" Buddy Rose, managed by Sherri Martel, and twice held the AWA World Tag Team Championship.

Early life
Douglas Duane Somerson, born September 22, 1951 in the heart of South Minneapolis, Minnesota, was the youngest of seven children of Carl and Dorothy Somerson.  He had four brothers Jack, Russ, Dennis, and Gene and two sisters Barbara and Shirley. He was also uncle to author and model Julie Somerson.

Professional wrestling career
In Minneapolis in 1986 as part of Verne Gagne's American Wrestling Association (AWA) Somers teamed up with "Playboy" Buddy Rose and manager Sherri Martel. The duo captured the AWA World Tag Team Championship by defeating Curt Hennig and Scott Hall via countout on May 17, 1986. They went on to feud with The Midnight Rockers (Shawn Michaels and Marty Jannetty) over the belts for the remainder of 1986, culminating with Michaels and Jannetty winning the title on January 17, 1987.

Somers would continue to wrestle for the AWA as both a singles wrestler and tag team wrestler (with both Buddy Wolfe and Kevin Kelly) throughout 1987. He would also be a last minute replacement for Boris Zukhov (who jumped to the World Wrestling Federation) as Soldat Ustinov's tag team partner in a title defense against Jerry Lawler and Bill Dundee.

Somers resurfaced in the AWA in 1989, managed by Johnny Valiant. Somers went on to wrestle on the independent circuit and for the Global Wrestling Federation in 1991, taking part in their TV title tournament. He has also wrestled for Georgia independent company Folkstyle Championship Wrestling, in a feud with Frankie Valentine. At WCW Halloween Havoc 1991, Somers lost to Van Hammer in the first PPV match of his career. In 1992, Somers made several appearances for the World Wrestling Federation as an enhancement talent on their weekly syndicated programming.

On May 1, 2011 at the Memorial Mayhem 2 show, Somers debuted for NWA Rampage. He was on guest commentary during the television title match between champion Jeremy Vain and Somers' trainee Frankie Valentine. Vain defeated Valentine after Somers turned on Valentine and cost him the match. Afterwards Somers attacked Valentine. On May 15 Somers accompanied Vain & Sal Rinauro to the ring during their semi-final match in the NWA RPW tag team title tournament against Valentine & Kyle Matthews. Matthews & Valentine won the match. Somers interfered several times in the match. On May 29 Somers interfered in the finals of the tournament between Valentine & Matthews and Cru Jones & Chip Day costing Valentine & Matthews the match.

Death
Somers died on May 16, 2017, at the age of 65.

Championships and accomplishments
American Independent Wrestling Federation
AIWF World Heavyweight Championship (1 time)
American Wrestling Association
AWA World Tag Team Championship (2 times) - with Buddy Rose and Soldat Ustinov
NWA Tri-State
NWA Tri-State Tag Team Championship (2 times) - with Ron McFarlane
Western States Sports
NWA Western States Heavyweight Championship (1 time)
NWA Western States Tag Team Championship (1 time) - with Roger Kirby

References

External links 
 

1951 births
2017 deaths
20th-century professional wrestlers
American male professional wrestlers
People from Minneapolis
Professional wrestlers from Minneapolis
AWA World Tag Team Champions